Frank Johnson may refer to:

Entertainment
 Francis Johnson (composer) (1792–1844), known as Frank, American musician and composer
 Frank Johnson (musician) (c. 1790–1871), American musician
 Frank Tenney Johnson (1874–1939), painter of the American west
 Frankie Darro (1917–1976), American actor born Frank Johnson Jr.
 Frank E. Johnson, American cinematographer, producer and film director
 Frank Johnson Publications, an Australian comic book publisher

Politics
 Frank Johnson (politician) (1848–1904), journalist and politician in colonial South Australia
 Frank Johnson (mayor) (1855–1921), mayor of Adelaide, 1907–1909
 Frank H. Johnson (1867–?), American politician
 Frank B. Johnson (politician) (1894–1949), American politician in Minnesota

Sports
 Frank Johnson (American football) (died 1890), American football coach
 Frank Johnson (1930s outfielder), American baseball player
 Frank Johnson (footballer, born 1916) (1916–1979), Australian rules footballer for Geelong
 Frank Johnson (rugby league) (1922–1993), Australian rugby league player, coach and administrator
 Frank Johnson (boxer) (1928–1970), English boxer of the 1940s and 1950s
 Frank Johnson (footballer, born 1932) (1932–2016), Australian rules player and member of the Australian Football Hall of Fame
 Frank Johnson (footballer, born 1936), Australian rules footballer for South Fremantle, Footscray and Fitzroy
 Frank Johnson (1960s outfielder) (born 1942), American professional baseball player
 Frank Johnson (basketball) (born 1958), American professional basketball player and coach

Other
 Frank W. Johnson (1799–1884), a commander of the Texan Army during the Texas Revolution
 Frank Johnson Goodnow (1859–1939), American educator and legal scholar
 Frank Johnson (RAF airman) (1896–1961), British World War I ace
 Frank Minis Johnson (1918–1999), United States Federal judge
 Frank Johnson (journalist) (1943–2006), British editor of The Spectator
 Frank B. Johnson (pathologist), African American chemical pathologist

See also
Franklin Johnson (disambiguation)
Francis Johnson (disambiguation)
Frank Johnston (disambiguation)